Here We Stand, released in November 2007, is the 6th studio album by English punk rock band Cock Sparrer. Recorded by former Vibrators bassist, Pat Collier, and mixed by Rancid's Lars Frederiksen and Michael Rosen, the album is the band's first new material for ten years. In addition to the 14-track CD version, the album was also released on vinyl as a picture disc. The tracks "Will You?" and "So Many Things" were omitted to improve the overall sound quality.

A 7-inch picture disc single, limited to 1000 copies, was released at the same time. It contained "Too Late" (the album's opening song), and a rerecorded version of "Because You're Young" exclusive to the picture disc single.

CD track listing
All songs written by Cock Sparrer: Burgess, Smith, McFaull, Beaufoy, Bruce.
 "Too Late" – 3:02
 "Gotta Get Out" – 3:34
 "Did You Have a Nice Life Without Me?" – 3:01
 "True to Yourself" – 3:29
 "Time to Make Your Move" – 2:38
 "Will You?" – 3:31
 "Better Than This" – 3:32
 "Don't Stop" – 3:40
 "Spirit of '76" – 3:55
 "So Many Things" – 3:28
 "Last Orders" – 2:28
 "Despite All This" – 3:03
 "Sussed" – 3:08
 "Suicide Girls" – 3:03

Vinyl track listing

Side one
 Too Late
 Gotta Get Out
 Did You Have a Nice Life Without Me?
 True to Yourself
 Time to Make Your Move
 Better Than This

Side two
 Don't Stop
 Spirit of '76
 Last Orders
 Despite All This
 Sussed
 Suicide Girls

Personnel
Colin McFaull – vocals
Micky Beaufoy – lead guitar
Daryl Smith – guitar, vocals
Steve Burgess – bass guitar, vocals
Steve Bruce – drums
Additional vocals on "Suicide Girls": Daughters and Friends of Sparrer

Production
Engineer: Pat Collier
Recording Location: Perry Vale Studios, London
Mixing: Lars Frederiksen and Michael Rosen
Mixing Location: Biabella Studios, USA
Producer: Cock Sparrer
Mastering: Tim Turan at Turan Audio
Photography: Sam Bruce
Personnel and production credits source: CD insert booklet

References

2007 albums
Cock Sparrer albums